Beat Forster (born February 2, 1983) is a Swiss professional ice hockey defenseman currently playing for EHC Biel in the National League (NL).

Playing career
On February 17, 2015, Forster was re-signed to a four-year contract extension by HC Davos.

On February 13, 2017, Forster agreed to a two-year contract with EHC Biel worth CHF 1.4 million, despite two years remaining on his contract with Davos. The contract will start for the 2017–18 season.

International play
Forster played for the Swiss national ice hockey team at the 2006 Winter Olympics.

Career statistics

Regular season and playoffs

International

References

External links

1983 births
Living people
Arizona Coyotes draft picks
EHC Biel players
ECH Chur players
HC Davos players
Ice hockey players at the 2006 Winter Olympics
Olympic ice hockey players of Switzerland
SC Herisau players
Swiss ice hockey defencemen
ZSC Lions players
People from Appenzell Ausserrhoden